Denberg is a surname. Notable people with the surname include:

Lori Beth Denberg (born 1976), American actress and comedian
Susan Denberg (born 1944), German-Austrian model and actress